The 1992–93 rugby union Scottish Inter-District Championship seen a name change for the Anglo-Scots. The Anglo-Scots district was later to be renamed the Scottish Exiles to better reflect the Scottish diaspora.

1992-93 League Table

Results

Round 1

Round 2

Round 3

Round 4

Round 5

Round 6

Matches outwith the Championship

Trial matches

Blues: 

Reds:

References

1992–93 in Scottish rugby union
1992–93
Scot